In the geological timescale, the Tithonian is the latest age of the Late Jurassic Epoch and the uppermost stage of the Upper Jurassic Series. It spans the time between 152.1 ± 4 Ma and 145.0 ± 4 Ma (million years ago). It is preceded by the Kimmeridgian and followed by the Berriasian (part of the Cretaceous).

Stratigraphic definitions
The Tithonian was introduced in scientific literature by German stratigrapher Albert Oppel in 1865. The name Tithonian is unusual in geological stage names because it is derived from Greek mythology. Tithonus was the son of Laomedon of Troy and fell in love with Eos, the Greek goddess of dawn. His name was chosen by Albert Oppel for this stratigraphical stage because the Tithonian finds itself hand in hand with the dawn of the Cretaceous.

The base of the Tithonian stage is at the base of the ammonite biozone of Hybonoticeras hybonotum. A global reference profile (a GSSP or golden spike) for the base of the Tithonian had in 2009 not yet been established.

The top of the Tithonian stage (the base of the Berriasian Stage and the Cretaceous System) is marked by the first appearance of small globular calpionellids of the species Calpionella alpina, at the base of the Alpina Subzone .

Subdivision
The Tithonian is often subdivided into Lower/Early, Middle and Upper/Late substages or subages. The Late Tithonian is coeval with the Portlandian Age of British stratigraphy.

The Tithonian stage contains seven ammonite biozones in the Tethys domain, from top to base:
 zone of Durangites
 zone of Micracanthoceras micranthum
 zone of Micracanthoceras ponti or Burckardticeras peroni
 zone of Semiformiceras fallauxi
 zone of Semiformiceras semiforme
 zone of Semiformiceras darwini
 zone of Hybonoticeras hybonotum

Sedimentary environments
Sedimentary rocks that formed in the Tethys Ocean during the Tithonian include limestones, which preserve fossilized remains of, for example, cephalopods. The Solnhofen limestone of southern Germany, which is known for its fossils (especially Archaeopteryx), is of Tithonian age.

References

Notes

Literature
; (2004): A Geologic Time Scale 2004, Cambridge University Press.
; 1865: Die Tithonische Etage, Zeitschrift der Deutschen Geologischen Gesellschaft, 1865: pp 535–558.

External links
GeoWhen Database - Tithonian
Jurassic-Cretaceous timescale, at the website of the subcommission for stratigraphic information of the ICS
Stratigraphic chart of the Upper Jurassic, at the website of Norges Network of offshore records of geology and stratigraphy

 
03
Geological ages